The NGC 2997 group is a group of galaxies about 24.8 million light-years from Earth containing NGC 2997 as a member.  It is a group in the Local Supercluster along with the Local Group.

References 

G. De Vaucouleurs, 1975. Nearby Groups of Galaxies, ch. 5. the nearer groups within 10 megaparsecs. Published in "Galaxies and the Universe," ed. by A. Sandage, M. Sandage and J. Kristian.

Galaxy clusters
Virgo Supercluster